Wing chord is an anatomical measurement of a bird's wing. The measurement is taken with the wing bent at a 90-degree angle, from the most prominent point of the wrist joint to the most prominent point of the longest primary feather. It is often taken as a standard measurement of the proportions of a bird and used to differentiate between species and subspecies.

See also
 Bird measurement

References

Bird anatomy